Judita Sabatauskaitė (born 23 May 2002) is a Lithuanian footballer who plays as a midfielder and has appeared for the Lithuania women's national team.

Career
Sabatauskaitė has been capped for the Lithuania national team. She scored her first senior international goal against Cyprus during 2019 Aphrodite Women Cup.

International goals

References

External links
 Judita Sabatauskaitė at Lietuvos Futbolas
 
 

2002 births
Living people
Lithuanian women's footballers
Lithuania women's international footballers
Women's association football defenders